Martin Stevens may refer to:

 Martin Stevens (politician) (1929–1986), British politician
 Martin Stevens (musician) (born 1953), Canadian pop singer
 Martin Stevens (biologist) (fl. 2000s–2010s), British sensory and evolutionary ecologist

See also
Martin Stephens (disambiguation)
Stephen Martin (disambiguation)